Berat Island
() is an island in south-central of Albania, in the Osum river, in the city of Berat.

Geography 
Berat island is located in the Osum river, in the Berat Municipality, Berat District,
and it has an area of 3 hectares or 0.03 square km.
The island is located in the center of the city of Berat.

Development 
In February 2015, the design firm Atelier Albania announced a competition in partnership with the municipality of Berat for designs on the development of Berat Island. Supported by the Albanian Fund for Development, the competition sought out designs that created an interplay between the built and natural environments, as well as adapted flexibly to natural phenomena, such as flooding.

See also
Tourism in Albania
Albanian Riviera
Geography of Albania

References 

Islands of Albania
Geography of Berat County
Berat